Fire and Blood may refer to:

 Fire and Blood: A History of Mexico, a 1973 book by T. R. Fehrenbach
 Fire and Blood (Manowar), a 1998 music DVD by Manowar
 Fire and Blood (Daugherty), a 2003 composition for solo violin and orchestra by Michael Daugherty
 "Fire and Blood" (Game of Thrones), a 2011 episode of Game of Thrones
 "Fire and Blood" (song), a song by Ramin Djawadi for the soundtrack of Game of Thrones
 Fire & Blood (novel), a book by George R. R. Martin about the history of House Targaryen
 "Fire and Blood", the motto of House Targaryen in George R. R. Martin's A Song of Ice and Fire series
 Fire & Blood, a 2023 album by Jus Allah

See also 
 Blood and Fire (disambiguation)